A Twist in My Story is the second studio album from Secondhand Serenade. It was released on February 19, 2008, on Glassnote. The album features the songs "Maybe" and "Your Call", which are new versions of the songs from Awake produced with a band. The first single, "Fall for You" was released on January 21, 2008. The video premiered on TRL one week later.

The album debuted at number 44 on the U.S. Billboard 200 chart, selling about 16,000 copies in its first week.

The albums released in Australia contained a spelling error in the tracklisting, with 'A Twist In My Story' misspelled as 'A Twist In My '.

The first single from the album "Fall for You", was certified 2× Platinum by RIAA. This was released in Japan on Avex Group on October 21, 2009.

Track listing

References

2008 albums
Secondhand Serenade albums
Glassnote Records albums
Avex Group albums
Albums produced by Danny Lohner